Cho Sung-min (1973–2013) was a South Korean baseball player.

Cho Sung-min may also refer to:
Jo Seong-min (born 1976), South Korean gymnast
Cho Sung-min (basketball) (born 1983), South Korean basketballer for Busan KT Sonicboom
Cho Sung-min (sailor) (born 1987), South Korean sailor for Busan City